The Now Now Tour was a concert tour by the British alternative rock virtual band Gorillaz, in support of their sixth studio album The Now Now.

Personnel
Damon Albarn – lead vocals, keyboards, piano, acoustic guitar, electric guitar, melodica, keytar
Mike Smith – keyboards, backing vocals
Jeff Wootton – lead guitar
Seye Adelekan – bass guitar, acoustic guitar, backing vocals
Gabriel Wallace – drums, percussion
Jesse Hackett – keyboards, additional percussion on "Latin Simone (¿Qué Pasa Contigo?)" 
Karl Vanden Bossche – drums, percussion
Angel Silvera – backing vocals
Petra Luke – backing vocals
Rebecca Freckleton – backing vocals, vocals on "Sorcererz"
Michelle Ndegwa – backing vocals, vocals on  "Out of Body" and "Kids with Guns"
Matthew Allen – backing vocals
Adeleye Omotayo – backing vocals

Guest collaborators and additional musicians
Jamie Principle – vocals on "Hollywood"
Peven Everett – vocals on "Strobelite" and "Stylo" (Select dates only)
De La Soul – vocals on "Superfast Jellyfish" and "Feel Good Inc." (Select dates only)
Del the Funky Homosapien – vocals on "Clint Eastwood" (Select dates only)
Bootie Brown – vocals on "Dirty Harry" and "Stylo" (Select dates only)
Little Simz – vocals on "Garage Palace" and "We Got the Power" (Select dates only)
Hypnotic Brass Ensemble – brass on "Broken" and "Sweepstakes" (Dublin and Pico Rivera only)
Moonchild Sanelly – vocals on "Out of Body" (Roskilde only)
Benjamin Clementine – vocals on "Hallelujah Money" (Bilbao only)
Jehnny Beth – vocals on "We Got the Power" (Paris only)
Noel Gallagher – vocals and guitar on "We Got the Power" (Paris only)
Yukimi Nagano – vocals on "Empire Ants" and "To Binge" (Moscow and Boston only)
Gruff Rhys – vocals and guitar on "Superfast Jellyfish" (Winchester only)
Shaun Ryder – vocals on "Dare" (Winchester only)
Roses Gabor – vocals on "Dare" (Winchester only)
Mos Def – vocals on "Stylo" (New York City only)
DRAM – vocals on "Andromeda" (Pico Rivera only)
Graham Coxon – guitar on "Song 2" (Pico Rivera only)
George Benson – guitar on "Humility" (Pico Rivera only)

Set list
The following setlist is obtained from the concert held in Nuremberg on 1 June 2018. It is not a representation of all shows on the tour. 

The following setlist is obtained from the concert held in Toronto on 8 October 2018. It is not a representation of all shows on the tour.

Songs performed

Tour dates

Notes

References 

Gorillaz concert tours
2018 concert tours